The SC 2500 (Sprengbombe Cylindrisch) or cylindrical explosive bomb in English was a general-purpose bomb used by the Luftwaffe during World War II.

Design 

The SC 2500 had a single piece machined aluminum body with a welded nose piece.  Around the nose of the bomb was a kopfring - a metal ring, triangular in cross-section, designed to prevent ground penetration or to stop forward momentum when hitting the water.  The SC 2500 also had a circular braced tail ring with four fins.  The SC 2500 was similar in construction to the SB 2500 and the main difference between the two was the SB 2500's case was made of steel.  There were two transverse fuzes one in the nose and one near the tail.  The nose fuse had a centrally located break-up rod that crushed the nose fuze on impact triggering the explosives.  The SC 2500 was filled with Trialen 105, a mixture of 15% RDX, 70% TNT and 15% aluminum powder.  Externally there was a reinforced H-type suspension band and the bomb could be horizontally suspended in a bomb bay or horizontally mounted on a fuselage hardpoint.  The bomb could not be dropped in a safe state and it was advised to not drop the bomb in low level attacks.

References

World War II aerial bombs of Germany